Todd Livingston is a filmmaker and author.

Biography
Livingston began his career as a comedian in the critically acclaimed quintette (later trio) 'Open Season'.  The group toured the U.S. and Canada, headlining clubs and colleges and becoming regulars at L.A's Comedy Store, New York's Comic Strip and Improv, where they would often share the stage with Jerry Seinfeld, Adam Sandler and Chris Rock.

Livingston co-wrote and produced the group's novelty song "The Shakespeare Rap," which became a top 10 hit on the Dr. Demento radio show, and became the group's signature bit.

During the slim non-touring time, Todd took gigs acting for network TV and movies, including Unsolved Mysteries and Umberto Lenzi’s cult horror favorite Hitcher in the Dark.

Livingston co-wrote & produced and directed the supernatural comedy film So, You've Downloaded a Demon at Accidental Films and the graphic novels, mainly published by Image Comics: America jr., The Black Forest and The Wicked West, as well as The Living and The Dead, Chopper Zombie and the mini-series The Odd Squad. From 2006 to 2010, he served on the advisory Board and nominating committee for the Spike TV Scream Awards.

In 2007, Livingston was the model for Professor X for the Marvel comic book X-MEN Origins: Jean Grey painted photo-realistically by artist Mike Mayhew. Actress Ashley Benson was the model for Jean Grey as a teen.

Since 2017, Livingston has been writing Rocky & Bullwinkle comics published by American Mythology Productions.

Awards
The Black Forest won the Rondo Hatton Classic Horror Awards for Best Horror Comic of 2004, and in 2005 The Black Forest 2 won the award again.

In February 2021 Livingston's comic Starring Sonya Devereaux was voted Best Comic of 2020 by a poll on pop culture site Critical Blast. The book's illustrators, Brendon and Brian Fraim, were voted Best Artists, and Livingston and co-writer Nick Capetanakis were voted Best Comic Writers. It is only the second time in history of the awards that a book and its team have swept all three categories.

Sources:
http://criticalblast.com/articles/2021/02/04/horror-and-action-give-way-comedy-readers-select-best-comics-writers-2020-todd

http://criticalblast.com/articles/2021/02/03/sonya-devereaux-americas-306th-best-actress-comes-first-best-comic-2020

Publications
The Black Forest  (27 April 2004, co-authored with Robert Tinnell)
The Wicked West Volume 1 (2 November 2004, co-authored with Robert Tinnell)
The Black Forest Book 2: The Castle of Shadows  (4 October 2005, co-authored with Robert Tinnell)
The Living and the Dead  (30 November 2005, co-authored with Robert Tinnell)
The Wicked West Volume 2: Abomination & Other Tales]]'' (31 October 2006, co-authored with Robert Tinnell)
The ODD Squad (2008)
Sheena, Queen of the Jungle: Dark Rising (2007, co-authored with Steven de Souza)
America Jr. Volume 1 (7 August 2007, co-authored with Nick Capetanakis)
Chopper Zombie (12 August 2008)
Starring Sonya Devereaux (10 August 2016 – present)
Rocky & Bullwinkle Adventures (2017)
Rocky & Bullwinkle: As Seen on TV (26 June 2019 – present)

Notes

References

External links
Accidental Films

American comics writers
American film directors
Living people
Year of birth missing (living people)